The 2016 BWF Super Series Finals was the final competition of the 2016 BWF Super Series. It was held from December 14 to December 18 in Dubai, United Arab Emirates.

Representatives by nation

§: Chen Qingchen from China and Christinna Pedersen from Denmark were the players who played in two categories (women's doubles and mixed doubles).

Performance by nation

Men's singles

Seeds

Withdrawn

Group A

Group B

Finals

Women's singles

Seeds

Group A

Group B

Finals

Men's doubles

Seeds

Withdrawn

Group A

Group B

Finals

Women's doubles

Seeds

Withdrawn

Group A

Group B

Finals

Mixed doubles

Seeds

Group A

Group B

Finals

References

External links
 Dubai World Superseries Finals at www.dubaisuperseriesfinals.ae
 BWF World Super Series at www.bwfworldsuperseries.com

BWF Super Series Finals
Superseries Finals
Sports competitions in Dubai
International sports competitions hosted by the United Arab Emirates
2016 in Emirati sport
Badminton tournaments in the United Arab Emirates